Cyrus (Persian: کوروش) is a male given name. It is the given name of a number of Persian kings. Most notably it refers to Cyrus the Great ( BC). Cyrus is also the name of Cyrus I of Anshan ( BC), King of Persia and the grandfather of Cyrus the Great; and Cyrus the Younger (died 401 BC), brother to the Persian King Artaxerxes II of Persia.

Etymology 

Cyrus, as a word in English, is the Latinized form of the Greek Κῦρος, Kȳros, from Old Persian  Kūruš. According to the inscriptions the name is reflected in Elamite Kuraš, Babylonian Ku(r)-raš/-ra-áš and Imperial Aramaic kwrš. The modern Persian form of the name is Kūroš.

The etymology of Cyrus has been and continues to be a topic of discussion amongst historians, linguists, and scholars of Iranology. The Old Persian name "kuruš" has been interpreted in various forms such as "the Sun", "like Sun", "young", "hero," and "humiliator of the enemy in verbal contest" and the Elamite "kuraš" has been translated as one "who bestows care".

The name has appeared on many monuments and inscriptions in Old Persian. There is also the record of a small inscription in Morghab (southwestern Iran) on which there is the sentence (adam kūruš xšāyaθiya haxāmanišiya) in Old Persian meaning (I am Cyrus the Achaemenian King). After a questionable proposal by the German linguist F. H. Weissbach that Darius the Great was the first to inscribe in Persian, it had previously been concluded by some scholars that the inscription in Morghab refers to Cyrus the Younger. This proposal was the result of a false interpretation of a passage in paragraph 70 of Behistun inscription by Darius the Great. Based on many arguments, the accepted theory among modern scholars is that the inscription does belong to Cyrus the Great.

There are interpretations of name of Cyrus by classical authors identifying with or referring to the Persian word for "Sun". The Historian Plutarch (46 - 120) states that "the sun, which, in the Persian language, is called  Cyrus". Also the Physician Ctesias who served in the court of the Persian king Artaxerxes II of Persia writes in his book Persica as summarized by Photios that the name Cyrus is from Persian word "Khur" (the sun). These are, however, not accepted by modern scholars.

Regarding the etymology of Old Persian kuruš, linguists have proposed various etymologies based on Iranian languages as well as non-Indo-European ones. According to Tavernier, the name kuraš, attested in Elamite texts, is likely "the original form" as there is no Elamite or Babylonian spelling ku-ru-uš in the transcriptions of Old Persian ku-u-r(u)-u-š. That is, according to Tavernier, kuraš is an Elamite name and means "to bestow care". Others, such as Schmitt, Hoffmann maintain that the Persian Kuruš, which according to Skalmowsky, may be connected to (or a borrowing from) the IE Kúru- from Old Indic can give an etymology of the Elamite kuraš. In this regard  the Old Persian kuruš is considered with the following etymologies: One proposal is discussed by the linguist Janos Harmatta that refers to the common Iranian root "kur-" (be born) of many words in Old, middle, and new Iranian languages (e.g. Kurdish). Accordingly, the name Kūruš means "young, youth...". Other Iranian etymologies have been proposed. The Indian proposal of Skalmowsky goes down to "to do, accomplish". Another theory is the suggestion of Karl Hoffmann that kuruš  goes down to a -ru derivation from the IE root *(s)kau meaning "to humiliate"  and accordingly "kuruš" (hence "Cyrus") means "humiliator (of the enemy in verbal contest)".

People and fictional characters named Cyrus include:

People

Given name

Ancient world
Cyrus I ( BC), King of Anshan
Cyrus the Great  ( BC or 576 BC–530 BC) – also known as Cyrus II – the grandson of Cyrus I, an Achaemenid ruler and founder of the Great Persian Empire
Cyrus the Younger (died 401 BC), brother to the Persian King Artaxerxes
Cyrus (architect), 1st century Greek architect who worked in Rome
Saint Cyrus (see Cyrus and John), 4th century Coptic saint
Cyrus I of Edessa, bishop (d. 396)
Cyrus II of Edessa, bishop (d. 498)
Cyrus of Alexandria (d. 642), Melkite Patriarch and co-founder of Monothelism
Cyrus of Panopolis, 5th-century Byzantine writer and official

Modern era
Cyrus Leroy Baldridge (1889-1977), American artist, illustrator, author and adventurer
Cyrus Townsend Brady (1861-1920), American journalist, historian and adventure writer
Cyrus Broacha (born 1971), MTV India VJ
Cyrus Ramone Pattinson (born 1994), Team GB Boxer
Cyrus Christie (born 1992), professional footballer who plays as right back for Middlesbrough F.C.
Cyrus Chothia (1942–2019), British scientist
Cyrus Edwin Dallin (1861-1944), American sculptor
Cyrus S. Eaton (1883-1979), Canadian-American banker, investor and philanthropist
Cyrus Edwards (1793-1877), American politician and lawyer
Cyrus West Field (1819-1892), American businessman who successfully laid the first transatlantic telegraph cable
Cyrus Frisch (born 1969), Dutch film director
Cyrus Herzl Gordon (1908 – 2001) was an American scholar of Near Eastern cultures and ancient languages.
Cyrus Hamlin (general) (1839-1867), Union general during American Civil War, son of Vice President Hannibal Hamlin
Cy Hungerford (1889-1983), American editorial cartoonist
Cy Kendall (1898–1953), American actor
Cyrus B. Lower (1843-1924), American Civil War Medal of Honor recipient
Cyrus McCormick (1809-1884), American inventor who developed the modern mechanical reaper
Cyrus Pallonji Mistry (born 1968), Irish-Indian businessman and Chairman of Indian conglomerate Tata Group
Cyrus Mistry (writer) (born 1956), Indian author and playwright
Cyrus Patell (born 1961), American literary and cultural critic
Cyrus Peirce (1790-1860), founder of first public normal school (teachers' college) in the United States
Cyrus Poncha (born 1976), national squash coach in India
Cyrus S. Poonawalla (fl. 1966–present), Indian businessman
Cyrus Rollocks (born 1998), Canadian soccer player
Cyrus Sahukar (born 1980), MTV India VJ
C. R. Smith (1899-1990), longtime CEO of American Airlines
Cyrus Vance Sr. (1917-2002), American politician and lawyer, U.S. Secretary of the Army under Presidents John F. Kennedy and Lyndon B. Johnson, U.S. Secretary of Defense under Lyndon B. Johnson and U.S. Secretary of State under Jimmy Carter
Cyrus Vance Jr. (born 1954), American politician and lawyer, son of Cyrus Sr. and former  Manhattan District Attorney (2010-2021)
Cyrus Villanueva, Australian singer who won The X Factor Australia in 2015

Surname
Ron Cyrus (1935–2006), Kentucky politician, and his descendants:
Billy Ray Cyrus (born 1961), American musician and actor, son of Ron
Trace Cyrus (born 1989), American musician, (former) lead guitarist of Metro Station, stepson and adopted son of Billy Ray
Miley Cyrus (born 1992), American actress and singer, daughter of Billy Ray
Noah Cyrus (born 2000), American actress, daughter of Billy Ray
Gordon Cyrus, Swedish performer and record producer
David Cyrus (born 1986), Grenadian footballer

In literature
 The Garden of Cyrus (1658) is the title of a discourse by the English physician-philosopher Thomas Browne.

Fictional characters
Cyrus, from The Revenge of Magic book series by James Riely.
Cyrus Beene, from television series Scandal 
Cyrus Trask, from John Steinbeck's novel East of Eden
Cyrus Bortel, from the animated TV series Kim Possible
Cyrus Goodman, from Andi Mack and Disney Channel's first gay main character
Cyrus Lupo, a detective from Law & Order
Cyrus Simpson, the brother of Abraham Simpson in The Simpsons
Cyrus, from the TV series Trailer Park Boys
Cyrus, from the animated series Sonic Underground
Cyrus "The Virus" Grissom, in the 1997 film Con Air, played by John Malkovich
Cyrus, a gang leader in the 1979 film The Warriors
Cyrus, the leader of Team Galactic and the main antagonist of Pokémon Diamond, Pearl, and Platinum
Cyrus Gold, the DC Comics character Solomon Grundy
Cyrus Smith, the leading character in Jules Verne's novel Mysterious Island
Cyrus, a vampaneze from the novel The Vampire Prince by Darren Shan
Cyrus (Chrono Trigger), in the video game Chrono Trigger
Cyrus, a Redguard pirate and hero in the video game The Elder Scrolls Adventures: Redguard
Cyrus Albright, one of the 8 main protagonists of the video game Octopath Traveler
Dr Cyrus Borg, Creator of P.I.X.A.L, CEO of Borg Industries in LEGO: Ninjago
Cyrus, an NPC in the video game Genshin Impact
Cyrus, an alpaca NPC introduced in Animal Crossing: New Leaf

Notes

References

See also
Koresh (disambiguation)
Syrus
Cambyses II#Etymology

English masculine given names
Masculine given names